Mast FM or FM 103 is a Pakistani radio channel broadcast from the Pakistan with the frequency .

It is a music radio station in Pakistan. It also broadcasts some shows by its hosts, in which they discuss specific topics. In the shows guests are also invited to the show for questioning and answering.

History
The radio station was founded in 2004 by Muhammad Imran Bajwa.

Popular shows 
Some of its popular shows are:
 Lok Lehar, Afzal Sahir
 The Late Night Horror Show - Minhaj Ali Askari
  M for Mohsin, V for Visaal - Mohsin Nawaz & Visaal
 Saturday night party - Sharaf Qaisar
 Sunday night show - Sharaf Qaisar
 Heer Ranjha Loaded - Shahaan Shaukat and Aira Khan
Mon to Tue night show - schezad shah
 12 se 2 ki last local - Ehsan ul haq
 12 bajay ki love story - Jahanzaib Zebi

Awards 
 Brand of the Year (2009)

See also 
 List of radio channels in Pakistan
 Hum FM
 FM 101

References

External links 
 Mast FM's official site

Radio stations in Pakistan
2004 establishments in Pakistan